The N-I was the former main road from Madrid to France in Spain.

Most of the route has now been replaced by the Autovía A-1 and Autopista AP-1. The A-1 starts at Madrid then goes to Burgos. N-I then runs parallel to AP-1 (toll highway) to Miranda de Ebro. It becomes again A-1 and goes via then goes via Vitoria, Altsasu (Alsasua), Beasain, Tolosa, Donostia and Irun.

N-I